Shock Me is an EP by American slowcore band Red House Painters. It was released in the UK only in 1994 on CD and 12" vinyl by record label 4AD.

Recording 

Shock Me was recorded and mixed at Coast Recorders, San Francisco in 1993. Additional recording took place at Razor's Edge, also in San Francisco.

Content 

The EP contains two versions of the song "Shock Me," a Kiss cover. The EP went out of print shortly after its initial release. The tracks later surfaced on the reissued edition of Red House Painters (Bridge), released in 1999.

The "untitled instrumental" hidden track is actually an instrumental version of "A Million + 8 Things", a song from the early Red House Painters demo tapes (dated 1991-1992).

Reception 

In his retrospective review, Dean Carlson of AllMusic wrote: "this mid-career EP displays a confident, introspective Red House Painters seemingly influenced by a parallel world where Nick Drake shoegazed it up with Ride or Chapterhouse. Somehow, it's quietly splendid."

Track listing

Release history

Personnel 
 Additional personnel

 Carla Fabrizio
 Dan Barbee
 Larry Ragent

 Technical

 Simon Larbalestier – sleeve images

References 

Red House Painters albums
1994 EPs
4AD EPs
Albums produced by Mark Kozelek